The United States military representative to the NATO Military Committee (USMILREP) is the senior uniformed representative of the United States Armed Forces on the NATO Military Committee. The appointee, an officer of the United States Armed Forces at the rank of lieutenant general or vice admiral, represents the United States on the NATO Military Committee and is responsible for articulating and providing military advice to the Chair of the NATO Military Committee. The representative has a deputy who holds the one-star rank of brigadier general or rear admiral.

The position was initially a four-star billet from 1950 to 1993, but was downgraded in order to grant precedence to the director of strategic plans and policy of the Joint Staff, a three-star officer who is dual-hatted as the senior member of the United States delegation to the United Nations Military Staff Committee.

The present USMILREP is Lieutenant General E. John Deedrick, who assumed the position in September 2021.

Organization
 U.S. Military Representative:  Lt. Gen. E. John Deedrick
 Deputy U.S. Military Representative : Brig Gen James E. Smith

List of representatives

|}

Notes

References

NATO Military Committee
NATO military appointments